Montgomery Building may refer to 

 Montgomery Building (El Paso, Texas), a building in El Paso, Texas
 Montgomery Building (Spartanburg, South Carolina), a ten-story highrise listed on the NRHP in Spartanburg County